The Financial Express is an English-language daily published from Dhaka, Bangladesh, established in 1993. The Financial Express with Standard Chartered Bank has an annual award program for best corporate social responsibility in Bangladesh. Shamsul Huq Zahid is now the editor.

References

English-language newspapers published in Bangladesh
Newspapers published in Dhaka
1993 establishments in Bangladesh
Publications established in 1993
Daily newspapers published in Bangladesh